Tim Harwill is a Métis-Canadian outlaw country singer/songwriter, based in Thorsby, Alberta.

Music career
Harwill's toured for decades as both solo artist and bandleader. To date, he's released 8 albums, either  independently or on a series of micro-labels. Often billed as ‘The 12-String Troubadour’, he toured North America performing an eclectic and personal blend of music in a signature vocal style. His music is identified as "Americana" and tells non-conformist tales of people and places encountered while living out scores of adventures on the lost highway. A working musician through most of his career, Harwill shared the stage and studio with many great talents including 'Godfather' of Americana music James Talley, seminal outlaw country singer/songwriter Steve Young, and rising Canadiana country star Tim Hus. He was joined by legendary Alberta country musicians Alfie Myhre and Richard Chernesky on 2012 studio release 'A Tribute to Catfish John'. His 2014 album release 'Dance Floor' meanwhile earned significant radio success in North America by placing two singles in the US Top 10 including the #1 Americana hit 'I Love My Dog' and the #7 Americana single 'Like Me & You'. A collection of 11 new songs written by Harwill, the 'Dance Floor' recording spent 5 weeks in the Americana Album charts in 2015, reaching #6 in the US and #3 in Canada. After an eight year hiatus, with long-time music partner Mike Beley, he reformed the Harwill band to release the digital album 'Still Nineteen' in 2022.

Personal life
While on hiatus, he returned to life as a writer under his family name of T.F. Pruden, publishing a half dozen novels, and writing a monthly column for counter-culture publication High Canada Magazine. A one-time professional boxer, he's earned raves for his work in a variety of fields throughout a storied life spent largely outside the boundaries of polite society. Legendarily reclusive, the rakish outlaw is divorced and lives quietly in small town Alberta.

Discography

Albums

* As lead vocalist of the Harwill band

External links
Roots Music Report ~ Album Review of 'Dance Floor' by Tim Harwill
Edmonton Journal ~ Harwill serves up flavorful Catfish
SaskToday ~ Musician on way to city today!
Tim on Instagram

Living people
Canadian singer-songwriters
Musicians from Alberta
People from Edmonton Metropolitan Region
Year of birth missing (living people)
Canadian Métis people